The Lutheran Church of Senegal (LCS) is a Lutheran church. It joined to Lutheran World Federation in 1992. It is also member in Lutheran Communion in Central & Western Africa. Church has 4,053 members and its president is Rev. Mamadou T. Diouf LCS has 13 congregations and it carries out proclamation work in two districts.

References

External links 
Lutheran World Federation on LCS

Lutheranism in Africa